Johann Wilhelm Cordes (14 March 1824, Lübeck - 16 August 1869, Lübeck) was a German landscape painter.

Biography 
He came from a family of merchants and had his primary education at the Katharineum. Originally, he was apprenticed to a commercial firm, but soon developed an interest in becoming a painter. He enrolled at the Academy of Fine Arts, Prague then, in 1842, transferred to the Kunstakademie, where he studied with Carl Friedrich Lessing and Johann Wilhelm Schirmer. This was followed by private lessons in Frankfurt with Jakob Becker. In 1848, he was a volunteer in the army of Schleswig-Holstein and served in the First Schleswig War.

He specialized in realistic landscapes, painted while travelling. From 1851 to 1854, he made several trips to Scandinavia with Hans Fredrik Gude, a friend from Düsseldorf. He also created coastal scenes with staffage.

In 1856, he returned to Lübeck and, three years later, at the request of Grand Duke Carl Alexander, moved to Weimar. This was his most productive period. He was appointed a Professor at the Weimar Saxon Grand Ducal Art School and, in 1862, was awarded the Order of the White Falcon.

In 1866, during the Austro-Prussian War, he took part in some military maneuvers and returned ill. He sought recovery at the spa in Travemünde, but died in 1869 at a friend's home. He never married and had no children, so his estate passed to his brother, Emil, who donated the remaining paintings to the Behnhaus museum.

Notes

References
 
Attribution:

Further reading 
 Jenns Eric Howoldt: Cordes, Johann Wilhelm. In: Alken Bruns (Ed.): Lübecker Lebensläufe. Neumunster, 1993 
 Susanne Peters-Schildgen: Johann Wilhelm Cordes: Ein deutscher Maler des 19. Jahrhunderts. In: Nordelbingen. Beiträge zur Kunst- und Kulturgeschichte, 1993, pgs.97-130
 Martin Thoemmes: Zwischen Wirklichkeit und Magie - Johann Wilhelm Cordes, eine Wiederentdeckung, in: Lübeckische Blätter ,2013 (Online)
 Alexander Basteck: Johann Wilhelm Cordes - Wilde Jagd und weite Landschaft, Museum Behnhaus, 2013 .

External links

1824 births
1869 deaths
Artists from Lübeck
German landscape painters
Düsseldorf school of painting
19th-century German painters
19th-century German male artists
German male painters